Rashidi Mfaume Kawawa (27 May 1926 – 31 December 2009) was the first Tanzanian Prime Minister after Nyerere in 1962 and  again the Tanzanian Prime Minister from 1972 to 1977.

Early life and education
Mr. Rashid Mfaume Kawawa was born in Matepwende village, Namtumbo District, Ruvuma Region on February 27, 1926. At 1935, he enrolled in the Tunduru Urban School in Lindi. From 1942 to 1947, he attended Middle School Dar es Salaam Central School before continuing his education at Tabora Boys School between 1951 to 1956.

Political career
Rashid Kawawa was one of the founders of the Federation of Workers in 1955, where he was elected as the first General Secretary, before joining the Uhuru movement. It was in this capacity that he began to take a more active role in the Tanganyika independence struggle, mobilizing employees. He was previously the Secretary General of the Government Employees Federation (TLF). Mzee Kawawa left his work at the Workers' Federation in February 1956 because he was a government employee, which banned him from acting in politics, and opted to join the TANU movement to seek Uhuru.

In 1957, he was a member of TANU's 24th Central Committee, and in 1960, he was Vice President of TANU. When Mwalimu Nyerere opted to go to the provinces to create a party and engage in political activities, he was nominated as Tanganyika's Second Prime Minister on January 22, 1962. He served in that capacity until December 8, 1962. He was reappointed to that office on March 2, 1972, and served until February 13, 1977, when Mr. Edward Moringe Sokoine took his place.

Rashid Mfaume Kawawa was named Minister of Local Government and Housing in the President of TANU's Government of Power in 1960.
He then became Prime Minister in January 1962, as a Minister without a Special Ministry, when Mwalimu Julius Kambarage Nyerere resigned in order to boost TANU.

Rashid Mfaume Kawawa was chosen Vice President in December 1962, when the country became a republic under President Mwalimu Julius Kambarage Nyerere.He was then appointed as the Second Vice President and Minister of Defense following the merger of Tanganyika and Zanzibar in 1964. During that time, he made significant contributions to the establishment of the Tanzanian People's Defense Force (JWTZ), laying the groundwork for the Force. In addition, he founded the Nation Building Army.

Rashid Mfaume Kawawa was appointed Prime Minister of Tanzania in 1972, a position he held until 1977, when he was re-appointed as Minister of Defense. In addition to these duties, Mzee Rashid Mfaume Kawawa was a Member of Parliament for Nachingwea in Lindi Region and afterwards Liwale from 1965 until 1985. In politics, he has held several roles, including General Secretary of the Revolutionary Party in 1980 and Vice Chairman of the CCM in 1982, and he is a permanent member of the CCM's Central Committee.

Death
Rashid Kawawa at 83, died on Thursday, December 31, 2009, at 3.20 a.m. at Muhimbili National Hospital. Residents of the City of Dar es Salaam had the opportunity to pay their last respects at the Karimjee Gardens on Friday, January 2, 2010, beginning at 7 o'clock in the afternoon, and he was buried on Saturday, January 2, 2010, beginning at 7 o'clock in the afternoon, at his residence in Wazo Area of Wazo Ward in Kinondoni District of Dar es Salaam Region.

Honours and awards

Honorary degrees
Makerere University, Doctor of Laws (posthumous)
University of Dodoma, Honoris Causa (posthumous), 26 November 2010

References

1926 births
2009 deaths
People from Ruvuma Region
Tanganyika African National Union politicians
Chama Cha Mapinduzi politicians
Prime Ministers of Tanganyika
Prime Ministers of Tanzania
Tanzanian Muslims